The Codfish Bowl is an annual Division III college ice hockey mid-season tournament. It is the oldest tournament operating at the D-III level and the second oldest extant tournament for any level of play.

History
In 1965 Boston State head coach Eddie Barry, looking for a lower-division answer to the Beanpot, founded the tournament with the help of athletic director Gus Sullivan. The series was used as a showcase for the smaller schools in college hockey and was absorbed by the program at Massachusetts–Boston when the two schools merged in 1982.

The tournament began before the NCAA instituted numerican divisions, but in 1973 it switched from College Division to Division II, where Boston State played. After the merger, UMB jumped up to D-II, allowing the tournament to remain at that level. In 1984, virtually all Division II schools dropped down to Division III, which is where the tournament has been played ever since.

The tournament was typically held before the New Year's Day, however, in recent years the championship has occurred both before and after January 1. This results in some years having two tournaments and others having none.

Yearly results

References

1965 establishments in Massachusetts
Recurring sporting events established in 1965
Ice hockey in Boston
UMass–Boston Beacons
College ice hockey tournaments in the United States